Paectes oculatrix, the eyed paectes, is a moth in the family Euteliidae. The species was first described by Achille Guenée in 1852. It is found in North America.

The MONA or Hodges number for Paectes oculatrix is 8957.

References

Further reading

External links
 

Euteliinae
Articles created by Qbugbot
Moths described in 1852